Dennis Joseph Thomas Bond (17 March 1947) is an English retired footballer who played for Watford, Tottenham Hotspur, Charlton Athletic and represented England at School and Youth level.

Playing career
Bond joined Watford as an apprentice in March 1964. The midfielder made 93 appearances and scored 17 goals between 1964–67 in his first spell with the Hornets. He joined Tottenham Hotspur in March, 1967 in a then record £30,000 transfer deal for the Hertfordshire club. Bond, a skilful and neat passer of the ball featured in 27 matches and found the net once in all competitions. The highlight of his White Hart Lane career was when he featured in a European Cup Winners' Cup match against Olympique Lyonnais in December, 1967. In October, 1970 he transferred to Charlton Athletic where he went on to make a further 75 appearances and netted three goals.

Bond returned to Watford in February 1973, initially on loan. He played 179 matches and scored on 21 occasions in his second spell with the club. After leaving Watford in 1978, Bond played Non-league football for Dagenham, Highfield Sports, Boreham Wood and Waltham Abbey.

References

External links
Watford's great midfielders
Charlton Athletic team photo of 1971

1947 births
Living people
Footballers from Walthamstow
English footballers
Association football midfielders
Watford F.C. players
Tottenham Hotspur F.C. players
Charlton Athletic F.C. players
Boreham Wood F.C. players
Dagenham F.C. players
English Football League players